This is a list of numbered regiments of foot of the British Army from the mid-18th century until 1881, when numbering was abandoned. Foot was the contemporary term for infantry.

Introduction

Rank and numbering

Establishment of precedence
The rank of regiments of the English Army was first fixed during the Nine Years' War. Doubts as to the respective rank of regiments fighting in the Spanish Netherlands led William III to command a Board of General Officers meeting on 10 June 1694 to establish the order of precedence of the various units.

With the union of the kingdoms of England and Scotland to form the Kingdom of Great Britain in 1707 the British Army came into existence (see Creation of British Army). The order of seniority for the most senior line regiments in the British Army is based on the order of seniority in the English army. Scottish and Irish regiments were only allowed to take a rank in the English army from the date of their arrival in England or the date when they were first placed on the English establishment.

The rank or precedence of regiments was fixed by the following criteria:
English regiments, raised in England, should rank from their date of raising
English, Scots and Irish regiments, raised for service of a foreign power, should rank from the date that they came onto the English establishment

This led to anomalies, such as the Royal Irish Regiment, raised in 1684, being ranked as the 18th of the line, junior to eleven regiments raised between 1685 and 1688. Similarly, the  Coldstream Guards is the oldest continuously serving regular regiment in the British Army. However, this regiment was placed as the second senior regiment as it entered the service of the Crown after the 1st Regiment of Foot Guards. (The Coldstream answered by adopting the motto Nulli Secundus—Second to None.)

Numbering
While regiments were known by the name of their colonel, or by their royal title, the number of their rank was increasingly used. Thus, in the Cloathing Book of 1742, which illustrated the patterns of uniforms worn by the King's forces, the regiments of foot are designated simply by numbers.

The substitution of numbers for names was completed by a clothing regulation of 1747 and a royal warrant of 1751. The 1747 document, which used numbers for the regiments throughout, decreed that no colonel was "to put his Arms, Crest, Device or Livery on any part of the Appointments of the Regiment under his command." Furthermore, in the centre of the regiment's colours was to be "painted or embroidered in gold Roman characters the number of the Rank of the Regiment". The warrant, dated 1 July 1751, repeated the instructions of the 1747 regulation and provided that regiments should in future be known by their numbers only.

As the size of the army expanded and contracted during the various conflicts of the 18th and 19th centuries, junior regiments were raised and disbanded. Accordingly, there were often a number of different regiments that bore the same number at different periods. Additionally, there were occasional partial renumberings. For instance, in 1816 the 95th (Rifle) Regiment of Foot was renamed the "Rifle Brigade", without a number. The existing 96th–103rd regiments were redesignated as the 95th–102nd.

Childers reforms
With modifications the numbers existed until 1881, when the Childers Reforms introduced "territorialisation". From 1 July 1881 the United Kingdom was divided into regimental districts, each allocated a two-battalion regiment, usually bearing a "county" title. Regimental numbers were abandoned: the 1st to 25th foot, which already had two battalions adopted new titles. The remaining regiments were paired to become the 1st or 2nd battalions of the new regiments. Two rifle regiments: the King's Royal Rifle Corps (ex 60th Foot) and the Rifle Brigade, who had four battalions each, recruited nationally.

Although the numbers were officially abolished in 1881, in some cases they continued to be used informally within the regiments. The regimental system introduced in 1881 was to last for more than seventy years. When new regiments were formed by amalgamation from 1958 onwards, the old regimental numbers were sometimes reintroduced into their titles. Examples are the 3rd East Anglian Regiment (16th/44th Foot), Worcestershire and Sherwood Foresters Regiment (29th/45th Foot).

Royal and subsidiary titles
The 1751 warrant confirmed the royal titles or other special designations of the 1st, 2nd, 3rd, 4th, 7th, 8th, 18th, 21st, 23rd, 27th and 41st regiments. In later years, other regiments were allowed to bear the names of the monarch or other members of the Royal family. Only one regiment, the 33rd Foot, was allowed to bear the name of a person other than Royalty when it became the "Duke of Wellington's" in 1853, the year after the death of the First Duke, who had served as a subaltern in the regiment.

County affiliations
On 21 August 1782, the Commander-in-Chief of the Forces, Henry Seymour Conway, issued a regulation giving an English county designation to each regiment of foot other than those with a royal title or highland regiments. The intention was to improve recruitment during the unpopular American War of Independence, and the Home Secretary, Thomas Townshend issued a circular letter to the lieutenants of each county in England in the following terms:
My Lord, The very great deficiency of men in the regiments of infantry being so very detrimental to the public service, the king has thought proper to give the names of the different counties to the old corps, in hopes that, by the zeal and activity of the principal nobility and gentry in the several counties, some considerable assistance may be given towards recruiting these regiments".

The names of the counties were added to the regimental titles in parentheses, ranging from the 3rd (Buffs – East Kent) Regiment of Foot to the 70th (Surrey) Regiment of Foot. In some cases more than one regiment was allocated to a county, for example, the 38th (1st Staffordshire) Regiment of Foot and 64th (2nd Staffordshire) Regiment of Foot. The attempt to link regimental areas to specific counties was found to be impractical, with regiments preferring to recruit from major centres of population. By June 1783 each regiment was again recruiting throughout the country, although the county names were to remain. In a few cases, affiliations were altered: for example the 14th and 16th Foot "exchanged" counties in 1809.

Fusiliers, light infantry and rifles
Fusiliers: The 7th, 21st and 23rd foot had borne the title of fusiliers for some time before 1751. These regiments had originally been armed with flintlocks (or fusils, from the French), rather than matchlocks. Later, the "fusilier" title was granted as a purely honorary distinction to the 87th Foot in 1827 and to the 5th Foot in 1836. The 101st to 104th Fusiliers joined the British Army from the Honourable East India Company (HEIC) in 1861.
Light infantry: During the Napoleonic Wars it was decided to convert a number of line regiments to light infantry, and in 1803 the 43rd and 52nd foot were accordingly redesignated as the 43rd (Monmouthshire Light Infantry) Regiment of Foot and 52nd (Oxfordshire Light Infantry) Regiment of Foot. In the next few years the 13th, 51st, 68th, 85th and 90th foot were converted to light infantry. By the middle of the 19th century the title of "light infantry" was largely an honorary one, reflected by the "elevation" of the 32nd Foot to light infantry in 1858 to recognise their gallantry in the Siege of Lucknow. Two more light infantry regiments subsequently joined the British Army, as the 105th and 106th regiments, transferred from the HEIC in 1861.
Rifle regiments: An experimental corps of riflemen, equipped with Baker rifles and clothed in rifle green uniforms, was formed in 1800, and numbered as the 95th foot in 1802. The 60th Foot, which had some rifle battalions, was converted to rifles in 1824.

List of regiments of foot

1st–10th foot

11th–20th foot

21st–30th foot

31st–40th foot

41st–50th foot

51st–60th foot

61st–70th foot

71st–80th foot

81st–90th foot

91st–100th foot

101st–110th foot

111th–120th foot

121st–130th Foot

131st–135th foot

See also
British Army order of precedence

References

Sources

Footnotes

British Army regiments of foot